First Coast High School is a comprehensive public high school in Jacksonville, Florida, United States. It was opened concurrently with its sister school, Mandarin High School. The school is one of 47 high schools in the Duval County School District. Like all Duval County schools, it is accredited through the Southern Association of Colleges and Schools.

History 
The school was opened in 1990. Its sister school, Mandarin High School, was opened concurrently using identical building plans. The school's design is unique for Jacksonville schools (other than Mandarin, which started with an identical layout). The school is built around a large paved courtyard, reminiscent of Spanish architecture from the colonial period of Latin America. In 2006, an additional wing was added to the school, to accommodate the explosive growth in North Jacksonville.

Academics 
As of the 2018–19 school year, First Coast High School had an enrollment of 1,991 and 94 classroom teachers , for a student-teacher ratio of 21:1. Of those 1,991 students, 49.2 percent (979) of them were eligible for free or reduced lunch under the National School Lunch Act.

In 2019, the school received an "B" on the Florida Department of Education's School Accountability Grading Scale. First Coast was one of 16 schools nationwide selected by College Board for inclusion in the 2007–08 EXCELerator School Improvement Model program. The educational partnership, funded by the Bill & Melinda Gates Foundation, was designed to raise the school's graduation rate and improve college readiness, especially among minority and low income students.

Notable alumni 
 Nigel Carr, former NFL football player
 Tavaris Barnes, former NFL Football player
 D. J. Killings, NFL football player
 Roland Powell, recording artist and comedian

References 

Educational institutions established in 1990
Duval County Public Schools
High schools in Jacksonville, Florida
Public high schools in Florida
1990 establishments in Florida
Northside, Jacksonville